Les sept âges du monde (c. 1460) is an illustrated manuscript on the theme of the Seven ages of the world from the workshop of Jacques Pilavaine of Mons, now Brussels (Bibl. Roy., Ms. 9047). It was in the nineteenth century incorrectly attributed to Simon Marmion of Amiens.

References

Illuminated histories
15th-century illuminated manuscripts